The zhanmadao was a single-bladed anti-cavalry Chinese sword. It originated during the Han dynasty (206 BC – 220 AD) and was especially common in Song China (960–1279).

General characteristics 
The zhanmadao is a single-edged sabre with a long broad blade, and a long handle suitable for two-handed use. It was used as an anti-cavalry weapon, dating from Emperor Cheng of Han, made to slice through a horse's legs. This is mentioned in the Wujing Zongyao, a Song Military Manual from 1072. It featured prominently against the Jin armies in campaigns between 1129 and 1141.

The earliest variant of the zhanmadao is called zhanmajian, literally "horse beheading jian". Zhanmajian existed during the Han dynasty, so called because it was supposedly able to cut off a horse's head. The difference between the two is that zhanmajian is double-edged whereas the zhanmadao is single-edged, which persists with the meaning of jian and dao. Another suggestion is that the zhanmajian was an execution tool used on special occasions rather than a military weapon.

Surviving examples include a sword that might resemble a nagamaki in construction; it had a wrapped handle 37 centimetres long making it easy to grip with two hands. The blade was 114 centimetres long and very straight with a slight curve in the last half.

Similar weapons 
Possible variations of these Chinese swords were the changdao of Tang dynasty and Ming dynasty, wodao of Qing dynasty, as well as miaodao of the Republican Era. The zhanmadao may have also been the inspiration for the Japanese ; both are written with the same characters and have been said to have been used for killing the horse and rider in one swing.

See also 
 Ōdachi
 Changdao
 Messer (weapon)
 Zweihänder
 Dao (sword)

References

Bibliography
 

Chinese swords
Horses in China